The Lolab Valley is a Himalayan valley located in union territory of Jammu and Kashmir, India. Valley is at an altitude of 1,590 metres (5,215 ft) above the Sea level.

An under-construction road from Bandipora to Lolab via Anderbugh Nagmarg Meadows will short cut the large distance from Srinagar-to-Lolab. In Lolab Valley, there are a few tourist huts and many camping sites.

Geography
The Lolab Valley is situated within the jurisdiction of Sogam Lolab, a block of Kupwara. Lolab is Sub-District of Kupwara. It is bordered by the Kashmir Valley to the south and the Neelum Valley to the north, and is separated by Nagmarg meadows from Bandipore to the east. It is formed by the flow of Lahwal River, which flows from east to west. The Lolab Valley is home of many ancient springs, and is covered with dense forests of pine and fir. Fruit trees such as apple, cherry, peach, apricot and walnut are common in the valley, which is known as "the fruit bowl of Jammu and Kashmir".  The valley has several natural landmarks and  tourist spots, such as the caves of Kalaroos and Green Meadows.  The main villages in the Lolab Valley are Saiwan, Putushai,Khumriyal, Sogam, Lalpora, Darpora, Cherkoot, Kalaroos, Wavoora, Warnow, Takipora, Cheepora, Goose, etc.

Ecology
Like other valleys in the region, Lolab Valley is also home to many Himalayan wild animals, which include Himalayan black bear, Himalayan brown bear, snow leopard, ibex, markhor, hangul and musk deer.  Lolab Valley is adjacent to Kishenganga Valley, and separated by the Line of Control. The Valley has seen many armed combats, which has resulted in the displacement of many wild animals.

Access
The Lolab Valley is well connected by road to Srinagar, the capital of Jammu and Kashmir, and Srinagar Airport. An under-construction road from Bandipora to Lolab via Anderbugh Nagmarg Meadows will cut short the Srinagar-to-Lolab distance by 50 kilometers. In Lolab Valley, there are a few tourist huts and many camping sites. It has the potential to become one of the best tourist destinations in Kashmir.

Tourism 

Travelers visiting Lolab sometimes visit the resting place of the saint Kashyap reshi, which is located at a distance of 1 km from village Lalpora. A spring called Lavnag can be found nearby. The spring is three feet deep and has crystal clear water. Gauri spring is another major spring in the area. Due lack of intervention by government the place has very poor flow of tourists which keeps it potential for tourism still unexplored. This place still manages to be one of the top most camping sites in Kashmir.

Some tourist attractions in the valley include Nagmarg Camping Site, Satbaran Kalaroos, Chandigam, Warnav, Machil, Kairwan Anderbugh, Green Meadows of Diver.

New Tourist Site (Kairwan) is under Construction at Diver Lolab.

Poem
Lolab Valley was once visited by the Urdu poet Muhammad Iqbal and he wrote a poem, O Valley of Lolab! in the honour of Lolab's natural environment which starts with:

پانی ترے چشموں  کا تڑپتا ہوا سیماب

مرغانِ سحَرتیری فضاؤں میں ہیں بیتاب

 اے وادیِ لولاب اے وادیِ لولاب

Your springs and lakes with water pulsating and quivering like quicksilver,

the morning birds fluttering about the sky, agitated and in turmoil,

O Valley of Lolab! O Valley of Lolab! گر صاحبِ ہنگامہ نہ ہو منبر ومحراب دیں بندہٌ مومن کے لیے  موت ہے یا خواب اے وادیِ لولاب اےوادیِ لولاب''' When the pulpit and the niche cease to re‐create Resurrections, faith then is dead or a mere dream, for thee, me and for all.O Valley of Lolab! O Valley of Lolab!''

Notable people 
 
 
 Shah Faesal
 Adhik Kadam
 Anwar Shah Kashmiri
 Ghulam Nabi Wani
 Nasir Aslam Wani

See also
Kupwara district
Diver Anderbugh

References

External links
Lolab Valley

Valleys of Jammu and Kashmir
River valleys of India
Kupwara district